Carrack Gladden (meaning rock on a bank) is a coastal headland in St Ives Bay at the eastern end of Carbis Bay beach between Hayle and St Ives in west Cornwall.

The acidic soils exhibit a range of vegetation types including maritime heathland, grassland and scrub. The heath and grassland habitats at the headland itself support the nationally scarce Soft-leaved Sedge Carex montana. On the steep, wet cliffs to the east, two other nationally scarce plant species Ivy Broomrape (Orobanche hederae) and Maidenhair Fern (Adiantum capillus-veneris) are found.

The site has been included by English Nature within a Site of Special Scientific Interest called the Hayle Estuary and Carrack Gladden SSSI in recognition of its biodiversity conservation importance.

References

Headlands of Cornwall